This article is a collection of statewide public opinion polls that have been conducted relating to the January Democratic presidential primaries, 2008.

Polling

Iowa
Iowa winner: Barack Obama
Primary date: January 3, 2008
Delegates At Stake 45
Delegates Won Barack Obama-16 Hillary Clinton-15 John Edwards-14

See also

New Hampshire
New Hampshire winner: Hillary Clinton
Primary date: January 9, 2008
Delegates At Stake 22
Delegates Won Hillary Clinton-9 Barack Obama-9 John Edwards-4

See also

Michigan
Michigan winner: Hillary Clinton
Primary date: January 15, 2008
Delegates At Stake 0
Delegates Won 0
NOTE:  In moving its primary before February 5, 2008, Michigan has violated Democratic Party rules and their delegates may not be seated at the nominating convention.

See also

Nevada
Nevada winner: Hillary Clinton
Primary date: January 19, 2008
Delegates At Stake 25
Delegates Won Barack Obama-13 Hillary Clinton-12

See also

South Carolina
South Carolina winner: Barack Obama
Primary date: January 26, 2008
Delegates At Stake 45
Delegates Won Barack Obama-25 Hillary Clinton-12 John Edwards-8

See also

Florida
Florida winner: Hillary Clinton
Primary date: January 29, 2008
Delegates At Stake 0
Delegates Won 0
Note:  In moving its primary before February 5, 2008, Florida has violated Democratic Party rules and their delegates may not be seated at the nominating convention.

See also

References

External links

 2008 Democratic National Convention Website-FAQ gives map with delegation information.
USAElectionPolls.com – Primary polling by state

2008 United States Democratic presidential primaries
Democratic